The Star Awards for All-Time Favourite Artiste is an award presented annually at the Star Awards, a ceremony that was established in 1994.

History
The category was introduced in 2004, at the 11th Star Awards ceremony; Chew Chor Meng, Li Nanxing and Zoe Tay received the award after winning the Top 10 Most Popular Male or Female Artistes award from 1994 to 2003. It is given in honour of an artiste who has won the Top 10 Most Popular Male Artistes or Top 10 Most Popular Female Artistes award for ten times (wins not necessary to be consecutive). Artistes who receive the award will no longer be eligible for the running of their respective Top 10 Most Popular Male or Female Artistes award from the year onwards.

The award was not presented in 2007, 2013 and 2018 as there was no artiste with ten Top 10 Most Popular Male Artistes or Top 10 Most Popular Female Artistes accumulated wins that allowed the award to be presented in those years. The award was not presented in 2020 as the ceremony was suspended due to the COVID-19 pandemic.

Eligibility
Ann Kok, Yvonne Lim, Jesseca Liu and Pornsak have the most wins without achieving the All-Time Favourite Artiste award, with nine for Top 10 Most Popular Female Artistes and Top 10 Most Popular Male Artistes respectively.

Recipients
Since its inception, the award has been given to 24 artistes. Zheng Geping and Dennis Chew are the most recent recipients in this category after winning the Top 10 Most Popular Male Artistes award from 2009-2013, 2015, 2018-2019, 2021 and 2010–2013, 2016–2019, 2021 respectively.

Felicia Chin and Rebecca Lim will receive their award at the next ceremony.

Colour key

 Each year is linked to the article about the Star Awards held that year.

References

External links 

Star Awards